25th Birthday Party is a recording of the Gong 25th Birthday concerts in October 1994.

Track listing

Disc one

 "Thom Intro" (Thom) – 1:18
 "Floating into a Birthday Gig" (Allen, Blake, Howlett, Lewry, Pyle, Smyth) – 5:39
 "You Can't Kill Me" (Allen) – 6:20
 "Radio Gnome 25" (Allen, Lewry) – 7:11
 "I Am Your Pussy" (Allen, Smyth) – 4:56
 "Pot Head Pixies" (Allen) – 2:54
 "Never Glid Before" (Hillage) – 5:47
 "Sad Street" (Hillage, Smyth) – 6:28
 "Eat That Phonebook" (Malherbe) – 3:27
 "Gnomic Address" (Blake) – 1:36
 "Flute Salad" (Malherbe) – 2:32
 "Oily Way" (Allen, Malherbe) – 3:26
 "Outer Temple/Inner Temple" (Allen, Blake, Hillage, Malherbe) – 5:25
 "She Is the Great Goddess" (Blake, Smyth) – 3:05
 "Iaom Riff" (Allen, Blake, Hillage, Howlett, Smyth) – 7:34

Disc two
 "Clouds Again" (Blake) – 9:57
 "Tri-Cycle Gliss" (Allen, Blake, Hillage, Howlett, Smyth) – 10:51
 "Get a Dinner" (Allen, Blake, Hillage, Howlett, Smyth) – 2:03
 "Zero Where Are You?" (Allen, Blake, Hillage, Howlett, Smyth) – 1:29
 "Be Who You Are My Friends" (Allen, Blake, Hillage, Howlett, Smyth) – 2:33
 "It's the World of Illusion" (Allen, Blake, Hillage, Howlett, Smyth) – 3:00
 "Why Don't You Try" (Allen, Blake, Hillage, Howlett, Smyth) – 2:19
 "I Am You" (Allen, Blake, Hillage, Howlett, Smyth) – 6:37
 "Introducing the Musicians" (Allen, Blake, Howlett, Lewry, Pyle, Smyth) – 3:03

Personnel
Musicians
 Daevid Allen – guitar, vocals
 Tim Blake – synthesizer, vocals
 Mike Howlett – bass, bass guitar
 Didier Malherbe – flute, saxophone, vocals
 Pip Pyle – Drums
 Stephen Lewry – guitar, vocals
 Gilli Smyth – space whisper, vocals, whisper
 Shyamal Maitra – vocals

Production
 Daevid Allen – editing, mixing
 Bob Delvishio – photography
 Nigel Gilroy – mixing
 Peter Hartl – design
 Mike Howlett – editing, mixing
 Pierre Moerlen – composer
 Mike O'Brien – photography
 Steffy Sharpstring – editing, mixing
 Grant Showbiz – Mixing
 Chris Thorpe – editing, engineer, mixing
 Don Walker – digital editing

References

External links
 

Gong (band) live albums
1995 live albums